

Africa

President – Abdelmadjid Tebboune, President of Algeria (2019–present)
Prime Minister – Aymen Benabderrahmane, Prime Minister of Algeria (2021–present)

President – João Lourenço, President of Angola (2017–present)

President – Patrice Talon, President of Benin (2016–present)

President – Mokgweetsi Masisi, President of Botswana (2018–present)

Junta Leader  – Ibrahim Traoré, President of the Patriotic Movement for Safeguard and Restoration (2022–present)
President – Ibrahim Traoré, Interim President of Burkina Faso (2022–present)
Prime Minister – Apollinaire Joachim Kyélem de Tambèla, Prime Minister of Burkina Faso (2022–present)

President – Évariste Ndayishimiye, President of Burundi (2020–present) 
Prime Minister – Gervais Ndirakobuca, Prime Minister of Burundi (2022–present)

President – Paul Biya, President of Cameroon (1982–present)
Prime Minister – Joseph Ngute, Prime Minister of Cameroon (2019–present)

President – José Maria Neves, President of Cape Verde (2021–present)
Prime Minister – Ulisses Correia e Silva, Prime Minister of Cape Verde (2016–present)

President  – Faustin-Archange Touadéra, President of the Central African Republic (2016–present)
Prime Minister – Félix Moloua, Prime Minister of the Central African Republic (2022–present)

President – Mahamat Déby, Transitional President of Chad (2021–present)
Prime Minister – Saleh Kebzabo, Prime Minister of Chad (2022–present)

President – Azali Assoumani, President of the Comoros (2016–present)

President – Denis Sassou Nguesso, President of the Republic of the Congo (1997–present)
Prime Minister – Anatole Collinet Makosso, Prime Minister of the Republic of the Congo (2021–present)

President – Félix Tshisekedi, President of the Democratic Republic of the Congo (2019–present)
Prime Minister – Jean-Michel Sama Lukonde, Prime Minister of the Democratic Republic of the Congo (2021–present)

President – Ismaïl Omar Guelleh, President of Djibouti (1999–present)
Prime Minister – Abdoulkader Kamil Mohamed, Prime Minister of Djibouti (2013–present)

President – Abdel Fattah el-Sisi, President of Egypt (2014–present)
Prime Minister – Moustafa Madbouly, Prime Minister of Egypt (2018–present)

President – Teodoro Obiang Nguema Mbasogo, President of Equatorial Guinea (1979–present)
Prime Minister – 
Francisco Pascual Obama Asue, Prime Minister of Equatorial Guinea (2016–2023)
Manuela Roka Botey, Prime Minister of Equatorial Guinea (2023–present)

President – Isaias Afwerki, President of Eritrea (1991–present)

Monarch – Mswati III, King of Eswatini (1986–present)
Prime Minister – Cleopas Dlamini, Prime Minister of Eswatini (2021–present)

President – Sahle-Work Zewde, President of Ethiopia (2018–present)
Prime Minister – Abiy Ahmed, Prime Minister of Ethiopia (2018–present)

President – Ali Bongo Ondimba, President of Gabon (2009–present)
Prime Minister – 
Rose Christiane Raponda, Prime Minister of Gabon (2020–2023)
Alain Claude Bilie By Nze, Prime Minister of Gabon (2023–present)

President – Adama Barrow, President of the Gambia (2017–present)

President – Nana Akufo-Addo, President of Ghana (2017–present)

Junta Leader  – Mamady Doumbouya, Chairman of the National Committee of Reconciliation and Development (2021–present)
President  – Mamady Doumbouya, Interim President of Guinea (2021–present)
Prime Minister – Bernard Goumou, Interim Prime Minister of Guinea (2022–present)

President – Umaro Sissoco Embaló, President of Guinea-Bissau (2020–present)
Prime Minister – Nuno Gomes Nabiam, Prime Minister of Guinea-Bissau (2020–present)

President – Alassane Ouattara, President of the Ivory Coast (2010–present)
Prime Minister – Patrick Achi, Prime Minister of the Ivory Coast (2021–present)

President – William Ruto, President of Kenya (2022–present) 

Monarch – Letsie III, King of Lesotho (1996–present)
Prime Minister – Sam Matekane, Prime Minister of Lesotho (2022–present)

President – George Weah, President of Liberia (2018–present)

Government of National Unity
Head of State – Mohamed al-Menfi, Chairman of the Presidential Council of Libya (2021–present)
Prime Minister – Abdul Hamid Dbeibeh, Prime Minister of Libya (2021–present)
Government of National Stability (unrecognized, rival government)
Prime Minister – Fathi Bashagha, Prime Minister of Libya (2022–present)

President – Andry Rajoelina, President of Madagascar (2019–present)
Prime Minister – Christian Ntsay, Prime Minister of Madagascar (2018–present)

President – Lazarus Chakwera, President of Malawi (2020–present)

President – Assimi Goïta, Interim President of Mali (2021–present)
Prime Minister – Abdoulaye Maïga, Interim Prime Minister of Mali (2022–present)

President – Mohamed Ould Ghazouani, President of Mauritania (2019–present)
Prime Minister – Mohamed Ould Bilal, Prime Minister of Mauritania (2020–present)

President – Pritvirajsing Roopun, President of Mauritius (2019–present)
Prime Minister – Pravind Jugnauth, Prime Minister of Mauritius (2017–present)

Monarch – Mohammed VI, King of Morocco (1999–present)
Prime Minister – Aziz Akhannouch, Head of Government of Morocco (2021–present)

President – Filipe Nyusi, President of Mozambique (2015–present)
Prime Minister – Adriano Maleiane, Prime Minister of Mozambique (2022–present)

President – Hage Geingob, President of Namibia (2015–present)
Prime Minister – Saara Kuugongelwa, Prime Minister of Namibia (2015–present)

President – Mohamed Bazoum, President of Niger (2021–present)
Prime Minister – Ouhoumoudou Mahamadou, Prime Minister of Niger (2021–present)

President – Muhammadu Buhari, President of Nigeria (2015–present)

President – Paul Kagame, President of Rwanda (2000–present)
Prime Minister – Édouard Ngirente, Prime Minister of Rwanda (2017–present)
 (self-declared, partially recognised state)
President – Brahim Ghali, President of the Sahrawi Arab Democratic Republic (2016–present)
Prime Minister – Bouchraya Hammoudi Bayoun, Prime Minister of the Sahrawi Arab Democratic Republic (2020–present)

President – Carlos Vila Nova, President of São Tomé and Príncipe (2021–present)
Prime Minister – Patrice Trovoada, Prime Minister of São Tomé and Príncipe (2022–present)

President – Macky Sall, President of Senegal (2012–present)
Prime Minister – Amadou Ba, Prime Minister of Senegal (2022–present)

President – Wavel Ramkalawan, President of Seychelles (2020–present)

President – Julius Maada Bio, President of Sierra Leone (2018–present)
Chief Minister – Jacob Jusu Saffa, Chief Minister of Sierra Leone (2021–present)

President – Hassan Sheikh Mohamud, President of Somalia (2022–present)
Prime Minister – Hamza Abdi Barre, Prime Minister of Somalia (2022–present)
 (unrecognized, secessionist state)
President – Muse Bihi Abdi, President of Somaliland (2017–present)

President – Cyril Ramaphosa, President of South Africa (2018–present)

President – Salva Kiir Mayardit, President of South Sudan (2005–present)

President – Abdel Fattah al-Burhan, Chairman of the Transitional Sovereignty Council (2019–present)
Prime Minister – Osman Hussein, Acting Prime Minister of Sudan (2022–present)

President – Samia Suluhu, President of Tanzania (2021–present)
Prime Minister – Kassim Majaliwa, Prime Minister of Tanzania (2015–present)

President – Faure Gnassingbé, President of Togo (2005–present)
Prime Minister – Victoire Tomegah Dogbé, Prime Minister of Togo (2020–present)

President – Kais Saied, President of Tunisia (2019–present)
Prime Minister – Najla Bouden, Head of Government of Tunisia (2021–present)

President – Yoweri Museveni, President of Uganda (1986–present)
Prime Minister – Robinah Nabbanja, Prime Minister of Uganda (2021–present)

President – Hakainde Hichilema, President of Zambia (2021–present)

President – Emmerson Mnangagwa, President of Zimbabwe (2017–present)

Asia
 
Supreme Leader – Hibatullah Akhundzada, Supreme Leader of Afghanistan (2021–present)
Prime Minister – Hasan Akhund, Acting Prime Minister of Afghanistan (2021–present)

Monarch – Sheikh Hamad bin Isa Al Khalifa, King of Bahrain (1999–present)
Prime Minister – Prince Salman bin Hamad Al Khalifa, Prime Minister of Bahrain (2020–present)

President – Abdul Hamid, President of Bangladesh (2013–present)
Prime Minister – Sheikh Hasina, Prime Minister of Bangladesh (2009–present)

Monarch – Jigme Khesar Namgyel Wangchuck, King of Bhutan (2006–present)
Prime Minister – Lotay Tshering, Prime Minister of Bhutan (2018–present)

Monarch – Hassanal Bolkiah, Sultan of Brunei (1967–present)
Prime Minister – Hassanal Bolkiah, Prime Minister of Brunei (1984–present)

Monarch – Norodom Sihamoni, King of Cambodia (2004–present)
Prime Minister – Hun Sen, Prime Minister of Cambodia (1985–present)

Communist Party Leader – Xi Jinping, General Secretary of the Chinese Communist Party (2012–present)
President – Xi Jinping, President of China (2013–present)
Premier – 
Li Keqiang, Premier of the State Council of China (2013–2023)
Li Qiang, Premier of the State Council of China (2023–present)

President – José Ramos-Horta, President of East Timor (2022–present) 
Prime Minister – Taur Matan Ruak, Prime Minister of East Timor (2018–present)

President – Droupadi Murmu, President of India (2022–present)
Prime Minister – Narendra Modi, Prime Minister of India (2014–present)

President – Joko Widodo, President of Indonesia (2014–present)

Supreme Leader – Ayatollah Ali Khamenei, Supreme Leader of Iran (1989–present)
President – Ebrahim Raisi, President of Iran (2021–present)

President – Abdul Latif Rashid, President of Iraq (2022–present)
Prime Minister – Mohammed Shia' Al Sudani, Prime Minister of Iraq (2022–present)

President – Isaac Herzog, President of Israel (2021–present)
Prime Minister – Benjamin Netanyahu, Prime Minister of Israel (2022–present)  

Monarch – Naruhito, Emperor of Japan (2019–present)
Prime Minister – Fumio Kishida, Prime Minister of Japan (2021–present)

Monarch – Abdullah II, King of Jordan (1999–present)
Prime Minister – Bisher Al-Khasawneh, Prime Minister of Jordan (2020–present)

President – Kassym-Dzomart Tokayev, President of Kazakhstan (2019–present)
Prime Minister – Älihan Smaiylov, Prime Minister of Kazakhstan (2022–present)

Communist Party Leader – Kim Jong-un, General Secretary of the Workers' Party of Korea (2012–present)
De facto Head of State – Kim Jong-un, Chairman of the State Affairs Commission of North Korea (2011–present)
De jure Head of State – Choe Ryong-hae, Chairman of the Standing Committee of the Supreme People's Assembly of North Korea (2019–present)
Premier – Kim Tok-hun, Premier of the Cabinet of North Korea (2020–present)

President – Yoon Suk-yeol, President of South Korea (2022–present) 
Prime Minister – Han Duck-soo, Prime Minister of South Korea (2022–present) 

Monarch – Sheikh Nawaf Al-Ahmad Al-Jaber Al-Sabah, Emir of Kuwait (2020–present)
Prime Minister – Ahmad Nawaf Al-Ahmad Al-Sabah, Prime Minister of Kuwait (2022–present)

President – Sadyr Dzaparov, President of Kyrgyzstan (2021–present)
Prime Minister – Akylbek Dzaparov, Chairman of the Cabinet of Ministers of Kyrgyzstan (2021–present)

Communist Party Leader – Thongloun Sisoulith, General Secretary of the Lao People's Revolutionary Party (2021–present)
President – Thongloun Sisoulith, President of Laos (2021–present)
Prime Minister – Sonexay Siphandone, Prime Minister of Laos (2022–present)

President – 
Michel Aoun, President of Lebanon (2016–2022)
Vacant, (2022–present)
Prime Minister –  Najib Mikati, President of the Council of Ministers (2021–present)

Monarch – Abdullah, Yang di-Pertuan Agong of Malaysia (2019–present)
Prime Minister – Anwar Ibrahim, Prime Minister of Malaysia (2022–present)

President – Ibrahim Mohamed Solih, President of the Maldives (2018–present)

President – Ukhnaagiin Khürelsükh, President of Mongolia (2021–present)
Prime Minister – Luvsannamsrain Oyun-Erdene, Prime Minister of Mongolia (2021–present)

State Administration Council
President – Myint Swe, Acting President of Myanmar (2021–present)
Junta Leader – Min Aung Hlaing, Chairman of the State Administration Council (2021–present)
Prime Minister – Min Aung Hlaing, Prime Minister of Myanmar (2021–present)
National Unity Government (unrecognized, rival government)
President – Duwa Lashi La, Acting President of the National Unity Government (2021–present)
Prime Minister – Mahn Win Khaing Than, Prime Minister of the National Unity Government (2021–present)

President – 
Bidya Devi Bhandari, President of Nepal (2015–2023)
Ram Chandra Poudel, President of Nepal (2023–present)
Prime Minister – Pushpa Kamal Dahal, Prime Minister of Nepal (2022–present)

Monarch – Haitham bin Tariq Al Said, Sultan of Oman (2020–present)
Prime Minister – Haitham bin Tariq Al Said, Prime Minister of Oman (2020–present)

President – Arif Alvi, President of Pakistan (2018–present)
Prime Minister – Shehbaz Sharif, Prime Minister of Pakistan (2022–present)

Palestinian National Authority
President – Mahmoud Abbas, President of Palestine (2005–present)
Prime Minister – Mohammad Shtayyeh, Prime Minister of Palestine (2019–present)
Hamas government in Gaza (unrecognized, rival government)
Party Leader – Ismail Haniyeh, Chairman of the Hamas Political Bureau (2017–present)
President – Aziz Dweik, Interim President of the Palestinian National Authority (2016–present)
Prime Minister – Issam al-Da’alis, Prime Minister of the Palestinian National Authority (2021–present)

President – Bongbong Marcos, President of the Philippines (2022–present)

Monarch – Sheikh Tamim bin Hamad Al Thani, Emir of Qatar (2013–present)
Prime Minister – 
Sheikh Khalid bin Khalifa bin Abdul Aziz Al Thani, Prime Minister of Qatar (2020–2023)
Sheikh Mohammed bin Abdulrahman bin Jassim Al Thani, Prime Minister of Qatar (2023–present)

Monarch – Salman, King of Saudi Arabia (2015–present)
Prime Minister – Mohammed bin Salman, Prime Minister of Saudi Arabia (2022–present)

President – Halimah Yacob, President of Singapore (2017–present)
Prime Minister – Lee Hsien Loong, Prime Minister of Singapore (2004–present)

President – Ranil Wickremesinghe, President of Sri Lanka (2022–present)
Prime Minister – Dinesh Gunawardena, Prime Minister of Sri Lanka (2022–present)
Syria

President – Bashar al-Assad, President of Syria (2000–present)
Prime Minister – Hussein Arnous, Prime Minister of Syria (2020–present)
Syrian opposition
 Syrian National Coalition (partially recognised, rival government)
President – Salem al-Meslet, President of the Syrian National Coalition (2021–present)
Prime Minister – Abdurrahman Mustafa, Prime Minister of the Syrian National Coalition (2019–present)
 Syrian Salvation Government (unrecognized, rival government)
Militant Leader – Abu Mohammad al-Julani, Commander-in-Chief of Tahrir al-Sham (2017–present)
President – Mustafa al-Mousa, President of the General Shura Council (2020–present)
Prime Minister – Ali Keda, Prime Minister of the Syrian Salvation Government (2019–present)

President – Tsai Ing-wen, President of Taiwan (2016–present)
Premier – 
Su Tseng-chang, President of the Executive Yuan of Taiwan (2019–2023)
Chen Chien-jen, President of the Executive Yuan of Taiwan (2023–present)

President – Emomali Rahmon, President of Tajikistan (1992–present)
Prime Minister – Kokhir Rasulzoda, Prime Minister of Tajikistan (2013–present)

Monarch – Vajiralongkorn, King of Thailand (2016–present)
Prime Minister – Prayut Chan-o-cha, Prime Minister of Thailand (2014–present)

President – Recep Tayyip Erdoğan, President of Turkey (2014–present)

National Leader – Gurbanguly Berdimuhamedow, Chairman of the People's Council of Turkmenistan (2023–present)
President – Serdar Berdimuhamedow, President of Turkmenistan (2022–present)

President – Sheikh Mohamed bin Zayed Al Nahyan, President of the United Arab Emirates (2022–present)
Prime Minister – Sheikh Mohammed bin Rashid Al Maktoum, Prime Minister of the United Arab Emirates (2006–present)

President – Shavkat Mirziyoyev, President of Uzbekistan (2016–present)
Prime Minister – Abdulla Aripov, Prime Minister of Uzbekistan (2016–present)

Communist Party Leader – Nguyễn Phú Trọng, General Secretary of the Communist Party of Vietnam (2011–present)
President – 
Nguyễn Xuân Phúc, President of Vietnam (2021–2023)
Võ Thị Ánh Xuân, Acting President of Vietnam (2023)
Võ Văn Thưởng, President of Vietnam (2023–present)
Prime Minister – Phạm Minh Chính, Prime Minister of Vietnam (2021–present)

Presidential Leadership Council
President – Rashad al-Alimi, Chairman of the Presidential Leadership Council of Yemen (2022–present)
Prime Minister – Maeen Abdulmalik Saeed, Prime Minister of Yemen (2018–present)
Supreme Political Council (partially-recognized, rival government)
Militant Leader – Abdul-Malik al-Houthi, Leader of Ansar Allah (2015–present)
President – Mahdi al-Mashat, Chairman of the Supreme Political Council of Yemen (2018–present)
Prime Minister – Abdel-Aziz bin Habtour, Prime Minister of Yemen (2016–present)

Europe
 (partially recognised, secessionist state)
President – Aslan Bzhania, President of Abkhazia (2020–present)
Prime Minister – Aleksander Ankvab, Prime Minister of Abkhazia  (2020–present)

President – Bajram Begaj, President of Albania (2022–present)
Prime Minister – Edi Rama, Prime Minister of Albania (2013–present)

Monarchs –
French Co-Prince – Emmanuel Macron, French Co-prince of Andorra (2017–present)
Co-Prince's Representative – Patrick Strzoda (2017–present)
Episcopal Co-Prince – Archbishop Joan Enric Vives Sicília, Episcopal Co-prince of Andorra (2003–present)
Co-Prince's Representative – Josep Maria Mauri (2012–present)
Prime Minister – Xavier Espot Zamora, Head of Government of Andorra (2019–present)

President – Vahagn Khachaturyan, President of Armenia (2022–present)
Prime Minister – Nikol Pashinyan, Prime Minister of Armenia (2018–present)
 (unrecognised, secessionist state)
President – Arayik Harutyunyan, President of Artsakh (2020–present)

President – Alexander Van der Bellen, Federal President of Austria (2017–present)
Chancellor – Karl Nehammer, Federal Chancellor of Austria (2021–present)

President – Ilham Aliyev, President of Azerbaijan (2003–present)
Prime Minister – Ali Asadov, Prime Minister of Azerbaijan (2019–present)
Belarus

President – Alexander Lukashenko, President of Belarus (1994–present)
Prime Minister – Roman Golovchenko, Prime Minister of Belarus (2020–present)
 Coordination Council for the Transfer of Power (partially-recognized, exile government)
President – Sviatlana Tsikhanouskaya, President of the Coordination Council (2020–present)
Prime Minister – Sviatlana Tsikhanouskaya, Head of the United Transitional Cabinet (2022–present)

Monarch – Philippe, King of the Belgians (2013–present)
Prime Minister – Alexander De Croo, Prime Minister of Belgium (2020–present)

Head of State – Presidency of Bosnia and Herzegovina
Bosniak Member – Denis Bećirović (2022–present)
Croat Member – Željko Komšić (2018–present)
Serb Member – Željka Cvijanović (2022–present: Chairwoman of the Presidency of Bosnia and Herzegovina, 2022–present) 
Prime Minister – 
Zoran Tegeltija, Chairman of the Council of Ministers of Bosnia and Herzegovina (2019–2023)
Borjana Krišto, Chairwoman of the Council of Ministers of Bosnia and Herzegovina (2023–present)
High Representative – Christian Schmidt, High Representative for Bosnia and Herzegovina (2021–present)

President – Rumen Radev, President of Bulgaria (2017–present)
Prime Minister – Galab Donev, Prime Minister of Bulgaria (2022–present) 

President – Zoran Milanović, President of Croatia (2020–present)
Prime Minister – Andrej Plenković, Prime Minister of Croatia (2016–present)

President – 
Nicos Anastasiades, President of Cyprus (2013–2023)
Nikos Christodoulides, President of Cyprus (2023–present)

President – 
Miloš Zeman, President of the Czech Republic (2013–2023)
Petr Pavel, President of the Czech Republic (2023–present)
Prime Minister – Petr Fiala, Prime Minister of the Czech Republic (2021–present)

Monarch – Margrethe II, Queen of Denmark (1972–present)
Prime Minister – Mette Frederiksen, Prime Minister of Denmark (2019–present)

President – Alar Karis, President of Estonia (2021–present)
Prime Minister – Kaja Kallas, Prime Minister of Estonia (2021–present)

President – Sauli Niinistö, President of Finland (2012–present)
Prime Minister – Sanna Marin, Prime Minister of Finland (2019–present)

President – Emmanuel Macron, President of France (2017–present)
Prime Minister – Élisabeth Borne, Prime Minister of France (2022–present)

President – Salome Zurabishvili, President of Georgia (2018–present)
Prime Minister – Irakli Garibashvili, Prime Minister of Georgia (2021–present)

President – Frank-Walter Steinmeier, Federal President of Germany (2017–present)
Chancellor – Olaf Scholz, Federal Chancellor of Germany (2021–present)

President – Katerina Sakellaropoulou, President of Greece (2020–present)
Prime Minister – Kyriakos Mitsotakis, Prime Minister of Greece (2019–present)

President – Katalin Novák, President of Hungary (2022–present) 
Prime Minister – Viktor Orbán, Prime Minister of Hungary (2010–present)

President – Guðni Th. Jóhannesson, President of Iceland (2016–present)
Prime Minister – Katrín Jakobsdóttir, Prime Minister of Iceland (2017–present)

President – Michael D. Higgins, President of Ireland (2011–present)
Prime Minister – Leo Varadkar, Taoiseach of Ireland (2022–present)

President – Sergio Mattarella, President of Italy (2015–present)
Prime Minister – Giorgia Meloni, President of the Council of Ministers of Italy (2022–present)
 (partially recognised, secessionist state; under nominal international administration)
President – Vjosa Osmani, President of Kosovo (2021–present)
Prime Minister – Albin Kurti, Prime Minister of Kosovo (2021–present)
UN Special Representative – Zahir Tanin, Special Representative of the UN Secretary-General for Kosovo (2015–present)

President – Egils Levits, President of Latvia (2019–present)
Prime Minister – Krišjānis Kariņš, Prime Minister of Latvia (2019–present)

Monarch – Hans-Adam II, Prince Regnant of Liechtenstein (1989–present)
Regent – Hereditary Prince Alois, Regent of Liechtenstein (2004–present)
Prime Minister – Daniel Risch, Head of Government of Liechtenstein (2021–present)

President – Gitanas Nausėda, President of Lithuania (2019–present)
Prime Minister – Ingrida Šimonytė, Prime Minister of Lithuania (2020–present)

Monarch – Henri, Grand Duke of Luxembourg (2000–present)
Prime Minister – Xavier Bettel, Prime Minister of Luxembourg (2013–present)

President – George Vella, President of Malta (2019–present)
Prime Minister – Robert Abela, Prime Minister of Malta (2020–present)

President – Maia Sandu, President of Moldova (2020–present)
Prime Minister – 
Natalia Gavrilița, Prime Minister of Moldova (2021–2023)
Dorin Recean, Prime Minister of Moldova (2023–present)

Monarch – Albert II, Sovereign Prince of Monaco (2005–present)
Prime Minister – Pierre Dartout, Minister of State of Monaco (2020–present)

President – Milo Đukanović, President of Montenegro (2018–present)
Prime Minister – Dritan Abazović, Prime Minister of Montenegro (2022–present)

Monarch – Willem-Alexander, King of the Netherlands (2013–present)
Chairman of the Council of Ministers – Mark Rutte, Prime Minister of the Netherlands (2010–present)

President – Stevo Pendarovski, President of North Macedonia (2019–present)
Prime Minister – Dimitar Kovačevski, President of the Government of North Macedonia (2022–present)
 (unrecognised, secessionist state)
President – Ersin Tatar, President of Northern Cyprus (2020–present)
Prime Minister – Faiz Sucuoğlu, Prime Minister of Northern Cyprus (2021–present)

Monarch – Harald V, King of Norway (1991–present)
Prime Minister – Jonas Gahr Støre, Prime Minister of Norway (2021–present)

President – Andrzej Duda, President of Poland (2015–present)
Prime Minister – Mateusz Morawiecki, Chairman of the Council of Ministers of Poland (2017–present)

President – Marcelo Rebelo de Sousa, President of Portugal (2016–present)
Prime Minister – António Costa, Prime Minister of Portugal (2015–present)

President – Klaus Iohannis, President of Romania (2014–present)
Prime Minister – Nicolae Ciucă, Prime Minister of Romania (2021–present)

President – Vladimir Putin, President of Russia (2012–present)
Prime Minister – Mikhail Mishustin, Chairman of the Government of Russia (2020–present) 

Captains-Regent – Maria Luisa Berti and Manuel Ciavatta, Captains Regent of San Marino (2022–present)

President – Aleksandar Vučić, President of Serbia (2017–present)
Prime Minister – Ana Brnabić, Prime Minister of Serbia (2017–present)

President – Zuzana Čaputová, President of Slovakia (2019–present)
Prime Minister – Eduard Heger, Prime Minister of Slovakia (2021–present)

President – Nataša Pirc Musar, President of Slovenia (2022–present)
Prime Minister – Robert Golob, Prime Minister of Slovenia (2022–present)
 (partially recognised, secessionist state)
President – Anatoliy Bibilov, President of South Ossetia (2017–present)
Prime Minister – Gennady Bekoyev, Prime Minister of South Ossetia (2020–present)

Monarch – Felipe VI, King of Spain (2014–present)
Prime Minister – Pedro Sánchez, President of the Government of Spain (2018–present)

Monarch – Carl XVI Gustaf, King of Sweden (1973–present)
Prime Minister – Ulf Kristersson, Prime Minister of Sweden (2022–present)

Council – Federal Council of Switzerland
Members –  Alain Berset (2012–present; President of Switzerland, 2023–present), Guy Parmelin (2016–present), Ignazio Cassis (2017–present), Karin Keller-Sutter  (2019–present) Viola Amherd (2019–present), Élisabeth Baume-Schneider (2023–present) and Albert Rösti (2023–present)
 (unrecognized, secessionist state)
President – Vadim Krasnoselsky, President of Transnistria (2016–present)
Prime Minister – Aleksandr Rozenberg, Prime Minister of Transnistria (2022–present)

President – Volodymyr Zelenskyy, President of Ukraine (2019–present)
Prime Minister – Denys Shmyhal, Prime Minister of Ukraine (2020–present)

Monarch – Charles III, King of the United Kingdom (2022–present)
Prime Minister – Rishi Sunak, Prime Minister of the United Kingdom (2022–present)

Monarch – Pope Francis, Sovereign of Vatican City (2013–present)
Head of Government – Cardinal Fernando Vérgez Alzaga, President of the Governorate of Vatican City (2021–present)
Holy See (sui generis subject of public international law)
Secretary of State – Cardinal Pietro Parolin, Cardinal Secretary of State (2013–present)

North America

Monarch – Charles III, King of Antigua and Barbuda (2022–present)
Governor-General – Sir Rodney Williams, Governor-General of Antigua and Barbuda (2014–present)
Prime Minister – Gaston Browne, Prime Minister of Antigua and Barbuda (2014–present)

Monarch – Charles III, King of the Bahamas (2022–present)
Governor-General – Sir Cornelius A. Smith, Governor-General of the Bahamas (2019–present)
Prime Minister – Philip Davis, Prime Minister of the Bahamas (2021–present)

President – Dame Sandra Mason, President of Barbados (2021–present)
Prime Minister – Mia Mottley, Prime Minister of Barbados (2018–present)

Monarch – Charles III, King of Belize (2022–present)
Governor-General – Froyla Tzalam, Governor-General of Belize (2021–present)
Prime Minister – Johnny Briceño, Prime Minister of Belize (2020–present)

Monarch – Charles III, King of Canada (2022–present)
Governor General – Mary Simon, Governor General of Canada (2021–present)
Prime Minister – Justin Trudeau, Prime Minister of Canada (2015–present)

President – Rodrigo Chaves Robles, President of Costa Rica (2022–present)

Communist Party Leader – Miguel Díaz-Canel, First Secretary of the Communist Party of Cuba (2021–present)
President – Miguel Díaz-Canel, President of Cuba (2018–present)
Prime Minister – Manuel Marrero Cruz, Prime Minister (2019–present)

President – Charles Savarin, President of Dominica (2013–present)
Prime Minister – Roosevelt Skerrit, Prime Minister of Dominica (2004–present)

President – Luis Abinader, President of the Dominican Republic (2020–present)

President – Nayib Bukele, President of El Salvador (2019–present)

Monarch – Charles III, King of Grenada (2022–present)
Governor-General – Dame Cécile La Grenade, Governor-General of Grenada (2013–present)
Prime Minister – Dickon Mitchell, Prime Minister of Grenada (2022–present)

President – Alejandro Giammattei, President of Guatemala (2020–present)

President – Vacant (2021–present)
Prime Minister – Ariel Henry, Acting Prime Minister of Haiti (2021–present)

President – Xiomara Castro, President of Honduras (2022–present)

Monarch – Charles III, King of Jamaica (2022–present)
Governor-General – Sir Patrick Allen, Governor-General of Jamaica (2009–present)
Prime Minister – Andrew Holness, Prime Minister of Jamaica (2016–present)

President – Andrés Manuel López Obrador, President of Mexico (2018–present)

President – Daniel Ortega, President of Nicaragua (2007–present)

President – Laurentino Cortizo, President of Panama (2019–present)

Monarch – Charles III, King of Saint Kitts and Nevis (2022–present)
Governor-General – 
Sir Tapley Seaton, Governor-General of Saint Kitts and Nevis (2015–2023)
Marcella Liburd, Governor-General of Saint Kitts and Nevis (2023–present)
Prime Minister – Terrance Drew, Prime Minister of Saint Kitts and Nevis (2022–present)

Monarch – Charles III, King of Saint Lucia (2022–present)
Governor-General – Errol Charles, Acting Governor-General of Saint Lucia  (2021–present)
Prime Minister – Philip Pierre, Prime Minister of Saint Lucia (2021–present)

Monarch – Charles III, King of Saint Vincent and the Grenadines (2022–present)
Governor-General – Susan Dougan, Governor-General of Saint Vincent and the Grenadines (2019–present)
Prime Minister – Ralph Gonsalves, Prime Minister of Saint Vincent and the Grenadines (2001–present)

President – Paula-Mae Weekes, President of Trinidad and Tobago (2018–present)
Prime Minister – Keith Rowley, Prime Minister of Trinidad and Tobago (2015–present)

President – Joe Biden, President of the United States (2021–present)

Oceania

Monarch – Charles III, King of Australia (2022–present)
Governor-General – David Hurley, Governor-General of Australia (2019–present)
Prime Minister – Anthony Albanese, Prime Minister of Australia (2022–present)

President – Wiliame Katonivere, President of Fiji (2021–present)
Prime Minister – Sitiveni Rabuka, Prime Minister of Fiji (2022–present)

President – Taneti Mamau, President of Kiribati (2016–present)

President – David Kabua, President of the Marshall Islands (2020–present)

President – David W. Panuelo, President of Micronesia (2019–present)

President – Russ Kun, President of Nauru (2022–present)

Monarch – Charles III, King of New Zealand (2022–present) 
Governor General – Dame Cindy Kiro, Governor-General of New Zealand (2021–present)
Prime Minister – 
Jacinda Ardern, Prime Minister of New Zealand (2017–2023)
Chris Hipkins, Prime Minister of New Zealand (2023–present)

President – Surangel Whipps Jr., President of Palau (2021–present)

Monarch – Charles III, King of Papua New Guinea (2022–present) 
Governor-General – Sir Bob Dadae, Governor-General of Papua New Guinea (2017–present)
Prime Minister – James Marape, Prime Minister of Papua New Guinea (2019–present)

Head of State – Tuimalealiʻifano Vaʻaletoʻa Sualauvi II, O le Ao o le Malo of Samoa (2017–present)
Prime Minister – Fiamē Naomi Mataʻafa, Prime Minister of Samoa (2021–present)

Monarch – Charles III, King of Solomon Islands (2022–present)
Governor-General – Sir David Vunagi, Governor-General of Solomon Islands (2019–present)
Prime Minister – Manasseh Sogavare, Prime Minister of Solomon Islands (2019–present)

Monarch – Tupou VI, King of Tonga (2012–present)
Prime Minister – Siaosi Sovaleni, Prime Minister of Tonga (2021–present)

Monarch – Charles III, King of Tuvalu (2022–present)
Governor-General – Tofiga Vaevalu Falani, Governor-General of Tuvalu (2021–present)
Prime Minister – Kausea Natano, Prime Minister of Tuvalu (2019–present)

President – Nikenike Vurobaravu, President of Vanuatu (2022–present)
Prime Minister – Ishmael Kalsakau, Prime Minister of Vanuatu (2022–present)

South America

President – Alberto Fernández, President of Argentina (2019–present)

President – Luis Arce, President of Bolivia (2020–present)

President – Luiz Inácio Lula da Silva, President of Brazil (2023–present)

President – Gabriel Boric, President of Chile (2022–present)

President – Gustavo Petro, President of Colombia (2022–present)

President – Guillermo Lasso, President of Ecuador (2021–present)

President – Irfaan Ali, President of Guyana (2020–present)
Prime Minister – Mark Phillips, Prime Minister of Guyana (2020–present)

President – Mario Abdo Benítez, President of Paraguay (2018–present)

President – Dina Boluarte, President of Peru (2022–present)
Prime Minister – Alberto Otárola, President of the Council of Ministers of Peru (2022–present)

President – Chan Santokhi, President of Suriname (2020–present)

President – Luis Lacalle Pou, President of Uruguay (2020–present)

Bolivarian Republic of Venezuela
President – Nicolás Maduro, President of Venezuela (2013–present)
2015 National Assembly (partially recognised, exile government)
President – 
Juan Guaidó, President of the National Assembly (2019–2023)
Dinorah Figuera, President of the National Assembly (2023–present)

See also
List of current heads of state and government

Notes

References

External links
CIDOB Foundation contextualised biographies of world political leaders
Portale Storia a list of current rulers by country
Rulersa list of rulers throughout time and places
WorldStatesmenan online encyclopedia of the leaders of nations and territories

State leaders
State leaders
State leaders
2023
Lists of current office-holders